Dongfeng Motor Corporation Ltd. is a Chinese state-owned automobile manufacturer headquartered in Wuhan, Hubei. Founded in 1969, it is currently the third largest of the "Big Four" state-owned car manufacturers of China, namely: SAIC Motor, FAW Group, Dongfeng Motor Corporation, and Changan Automobile, with car sales of 5.37 million, 3.50 million, 3.28 million and 2.30 million in 2021 respectively.

The company develops and markets vehicles under its own branding, such as Venucia, Fengdu, Voyah, Aeolus, Forthing, as well as under foreign-branded joint ventures such as Dongfeng-Honda, Dongfeng-Nissan and Dongfeng-Peugeot Citroën (all via subsidiary Dongfeng Motor Group). In 2021, foreign-branded cars took 79% of sales. It also produces electric vehicles under some of the previously listed brandings, including dedicated EV brands such as Voyah.

In addition to commercial and consumer vehicles, it also manufactures parts and cooperates with foreign companies.

Some sources may refer to the company as Dong Feng, use an acronym like DFM, or use the name in conjunction with others when referring to a subsidiary, joint venture, or other associated enterprises such as "Dongfeng Yueda Kia", for example.

History

Background and founding

During the Korean war, there was a need for trucks to be used on the battlefield. The Ministry of Machinery planned a factory to build an imitation of the GAZ-51 truck. This was originally planned to be at Qingshan District, Wuhan, and later revised to Wuchang District, also in Wuhan. In 1955, these sites were disregarded as being too vulnerable to air raids, and Chengdu was chosen as the proposed site. The reasoning is also mentioned in a dictate of Chairman Mao Zedong; as part of his "Third Front" strategy However, due to the poor state of the economy, the plans were shelved.

In 1957, Hunan was picked as the site for the proposed truck factory, as the Yangtze basin area of the province didn't have any heavy industry yet. In 1960 preparations started at the site in Shiyan, but were abruptly halted. As the Chinese economy improved, and as a result of the Sino-Soviet split, production of military trucks came into the spotlight again, and construction of the Second Automobile Works was included in the third five-year plan in 1965.

The company was officially founded in 1969 at a village of 100 residents, that would later grow to become Shiyan city. This remote location was chosen as its topography consisted of over 40 shallow valleys, allowing factories to be concealed, while also being on the route of the Xiangyang–Chongqing railway. Due to its remote countryside location with limited equipment, the company only managed to produce 200 automobiles by 1972.

Mass production (1975-2000) 

In 1975, the first EQ240 2.5-ton Dongfeng truck was produced, followed by the EQ140 5-ton model in 1978, which was also the first civilian truck by the company. At its peak the EQ140 held a domestic market share of 66%. In 1986, Dongfeng surpassed 100,000 vehicles produced annually. In 1987, a new 3-ton model was launched.

Traditionally manufacturing commercial vehicles, by 2001 these made up about 73% of Dongfeng's production. By 2012, that figure had reversed, and 73% of manufactures were passenger cars. However, the percentage of consumer offerings was likely lower as passenger car counts may include microvans, tiny commercial vehicles that are popular in China.

Between 1978 and 1985 alongside the market-based Chinese economic reforms instituted by Deng Xiaoping, Dongfeng was transformed from a manufacturer of two heavy-duty trucks with fragmented operations and ownership into a single, centrally managed enterprise. This process included placing all Dongfeng operations—from part manufacture to vehicle assembly—under the control of a single business entity and the merger of six truck production bases as well as a number of other companies previously controlled by provincial governments. Post-1985, further reforms took place that allowed Dongfeng greater autonomy; the company was removed from the direct administrative control of the central government.

By the mid-1980s, its assets had tripled from those initially given to it by the state in 1981, and management was desirous of even greater production capacity. But in 1995, the company was experiencing financial difficulties as was the case with many Chinese automobile manufacturers at this time. The situation was still dire in 1998 precipitating a 1999 restructuring of the company.

In 1992, the company changed its name to Dongfeng, or "East Wind" in Chinese.

This state owned enterprise has come into conflict with authority at both the national and provincial levels. Alongside First Automobile Works it saw the successful dismantling of the Automobile Corporation, a central government entity presumably tasked with preventing non-competitive business practices through dictating output volumes and curtailing purchasing as well as exasperation at the right of the State to make managerial appointments.

The Chinese partner in many Sino-foreign joint venture companies, Dongfeng initiated most of these cooperative efforts with foreign firms in the early 2000s. But its first was established in 1992 with French PSA Group. Known as Dongfeng Citroën Automobile Company (DCAC), it was the forerunner to the current Dongfeng Peugeot-Citroën Automobile Limited (DPCA).

2000 to 2010

By 2003, Dongfeng had established joint ventures with Kia Motors (Dongfeng Yueda Kia, 2002), Honda (Dongfeng Honda, 2003), and Nissan (Dongfeng Motor Co., Ltd., 2003). As of 2011, it had more Sino-foreign joint ventures than any other Chinese automaker, and the 2013 creation of a partnership with French Renault means it retains this title today.

In 2004, intermediate holding company of the group, Dongfeng Motor Group, became a listed company in the Hong Kong Stock Exchange; Dongfeng Yueda Kia remained in the unlisted portion of the group.

Dongfeng announced in November 2006 that they intend to sell their vehicles in Japan.

In 2009, it sold 1.9 million vehicles ranking second among domestic automakers and third overall.

2010 to present

In 2010, the company sold 2.72 million units, making it the second most-productive Chinese vehicle-maker. It reported 1.72 million sales of passenger vehicles that same year.

2011 production figures put the company in second place, in terms of production volume, in its home market; Dongfeng produced 3.06 million vehicles that year.

It was the second-largest Chinese automaker in 2012 by production volume, and Dongfeng manufactured over 2.76 million whole vehicles that year with passenger cars comprising 73% of manufacture. The number of cars counted as passenger vehicles may conflate consumer offerings and tiny commercial trucks and vans known as microvans, however.

Dongfeng established its first research and development facility outside of China in October 2012 when it acquired a 70 percent stake in the Swedish engineering company T Engineering AB.

In December 2013, Dongfeng and the French automaker Renault agreed to form a 50:50 joint venture, Dongfeng Renault Automotive Co Ltd., to manufacture Renault brand passenger cars for the Chinese market. The two partners agreed to invest an initial 7.76 billion yuan (US$1.27 billion) in the venture, which became Dongfeng's sixth joint venture with a foreign automaker—the most of any Chinese automaker.

In February 2014, loss making PSA Peugeot Citroën, a joint venture partner of Dongfeng since 1992, was recapitalized, with Dongfeng Motor Group taking a 14% stake.

In 2020, Dongfeng dissolved its ventures Dongfeng Renault, Dongfeng Yulon and withdrawn from Dongfeng Yueda Kia in 2021.

On June 12 2020, the mass-produced version of the Dongfeng Sharing-VAN 1.0 rolled off the production line at its technical center, demonstrating Dongfeng's 5G-enabled autonomous vehicle with level 4 applications.

Organizational structure
Dongfeng Motor Corporation (DFM) is the ultimate parent company using the Dongfeng name and is directly controlled by the State-owned Assets Supervision and Administration Commission of the State Council.

Dongfeng Motor Group (DFG) 
Dongfeng Motor Group (DFG) is a listed subsidiary that is majority owned (66.86%) by Dongfeng Motor Corporation The Dongfeng Motor Group (DFG) subsidiary is responsible for several joint ventures with foreign car companies, such as Dongfeng Motor Company Limited (DFL or commonly known as Dongfeng Nissan), Dongfeng Honda Automobile, Dongfeng Peugeot-Citroën Automobile. 

Of the joint ventures, DFL (or Dongfeng Nissan), formed in 2003, is the largest and sells Nissan-branded vehicles under its Dongfeng Nissan Passenger Vehicle Company (DFN) division. The DFN division also produces cars using Infiniti and Venucia branding. In 2017, DFL acquired 51% stake in Zhengzhou Nissan (total 79.651%) from its own subsidiary (at the time) Dongfeng Automobile Company Ltd. (DFAC) to consolidate Nissan China operations under DFL. Zhengzhou Nissan produced not only Nissan cars but also Dongfeng and Dongfeng Fengdu branded vehicles, which have since stopped. 

DFL initially also controlled Dongfeng's commercial division via ownership of Dongfeng Automobile Company Ltd. (DFAC) and Dongfeng Commercial Vehicle (DFCV) which have since been transferred back to Dongfeng Motor Corporation in 2022 and 2015 respectively. Another joint venture, Dongfeng Sokon (DFSK) produced primarily light commercial vehicles and passenger vehicles under Fengguang (Fengon) marque, but Dongfeng's 50% stake was acquired by the partner Sokon in 2019. As a result, the vast majority of commercial vehicle production under Dongfeng branding has been transferred out from Dongfeng Motor Group (DFG).

Other large divisions/subsidiaries under Dongfeng Motor Group include Dongfeng Research & Development Centre, Dongfeng Passenger Vehicle Company (DFPV), which produces vehicles under the Fengshen (Aeolus) marque, Dongfeng Liuzhou Motor, which produces vehicles under the Forthing (Fengxing) marque, Dongfeng Off-road Vehicle, Dongfeng (Shiyan) Special Purpose Commercial Vehicle.

Dongfeng Commercial Vehicle (DFCV) 
Dongfeng Commercial Vehicle (DFCV) is a 55-45 joint venture between Dongfeng Motor Corporation and Volvo which produces medium-heavy trucks under Dongfeng branding. It was formed in 1975 by Dongfeng Motor Corporation, and was transferred to DFL in 2003. In 2013, DFL sold the medium-heavy truck business back to Dongfeng Motor Corporation, who then formed the joint venture with Volvo in 2015.

Dongfeng Automobile Company Ltd. (DFAC) 
Dongfeng Automobile Company Ltd. (DFAC) is a 55% owned listed subsidiary that produces light commercial vehicles under Dongfeng branding. It was formed in 1998 by Dongfeng Motor Corporation, and was transferred to DFL in 2003, who held a 60.1% stake. In 2022, DFL transferred 29.9% stake back to Dongfeng Motor Corporation, who then bought another 25.1% from other investors, obtaining majority stake of 55%, fully streamlining all commercial vehicle production to Dongfeng Motor Corporation direct control. It has a 50-50 joint venture to produce Cummins diesel engines known as Dongfeng Cummins Engine Co. Ltd.

Marques
Dongfeng sells vehicles under various brand names. Other brands may be associated with products manufactured or assembled by joint-venture companies that see foreign firms cooperate with Dongfeng in order to gain access to the Chinese market.

Voyah

Voyah (岚图) is a sub-brand directly under Dongfeng Motor Corporation specializing in designing and developing electric vehicles. Voyah is the luxury division of Chinese State-owned automaker Dongfeng Motor Corporation.

Aeolus (Fengshen)

2009 saw the release of an own-brand sedan, the Fengshen S30, built with support from PSA Peugeot Citroën and in the same factories that produce its Peugeot and Citroën-branded products for the Chinese market. The S30 may have been the first instance of Dongfeng selling private label passenger vehicles using its own "Dual Sparrows" logo in combination with its name. It is produced by the Dongfeng Passenger Vehicle (DFPV) division of Dongfeng Motor Group (DFG).

Dongfeng EV
Dongfeng EV is a new marque using Dongfeng branding. It currently sells two products in Aeolus stores, the Dongfeng EX1 and Dongfeng Nano Box, both based on the Renault Kwid.

Fengxing (Forthing)

Dongfeng Liuzhou Motor Co., Ltd. is a subsidiary of Dongfeng Motor Group, located in the city of Liuzhou, Guangxi, China. Passenger vehicles produced by Dongfeng Liuzhou Motor bears the Dongfeng Fengxing brand and most products are based on older platforms from Mitsubishi and Nissan.

Venucia (under Dongfeng-Nissan)

Dongfeng Venucia Motor Company is a subsidiary of Dongfeng Motor Co., Ltd. established in 2017 and focused on the marketing and production of passenger cars. The Venucia marque, launched in September 2010, was originally owned by Dongfeng Nissan Passenger Vehicle, itself another subsidiary of Dongfeng Motor Co., Ltd.

Fengdu (under Dongfeng-Nissan)

Launched in 2013, Fengdu is a sub-brand of Dongfeng Automobile started by producing out of production Nissan CUVs bearing the Dongfeng logo. Older Nissan tooling was set up in China by Zhengzhou-Nissan to produce the second generation Nissan X-Trail rebadged as the Dongfeng Fengdu MX6.

Two concepts were unveiled at the brand's launch in 2020, the Voyah i-Land coupe concept and the Voyah i-Free crossover concept that previews the Voyah Free premium crossover that was introduced in 2021. The design of Voyah vehicles were co-developed with ItalDesign. Both concept vehicles previews the production cars of Voyah in the following years, and the initial concept and production cars are all built on Dongfeng's Essa electric platform.

Junfeng (under DFAC)

Dongfeng Skio is a sub-brand of Dongfeng that focuses on producing electric vehicles. The current lineup are mostly Dongfeng-petrol-car-based electric vehicles.

Current products sold under the Skio brand included:
Dongfeng Skio Junfeng
Dongfeng Skio ER30
Dongfeng Skio E11K

Joint ventures
Dongfeng is the Chinese partner in many joint ventures that make trucks and cars.

Dana
Dongfeng established its joint venture with American parts-maker Dana Holding Corporation, Dongfeng Dana Axle Co,  2005. As of 2011, Dana and Dongfeng both have 50% ownership of this joint venture.

Dongfeng Commercial Vehicles

In January 2013, Dongfeng and Volvo agreed to form a China-based medium- and heavy-duty truck manufacturing joint venture, Dongfeng Commercial Vehicles, with 55% ownership by Dongfeng Motor and 45% by Volvo. As part of the transaction, Volvo will pay 5.6 billion yuan (US$900 million) to Dongfeng, which will pay Nissan Motors to replace it with Volvo in an existing commercial vehicle joint venture. It's unclear if the vehicles produced will be sold under the Volvo brand as a smaller, pre-existing Volvo-Dongfeng joint venture markets and assembles products with a "UD" brand and the Dongfeng brand name is traditionally used on commercial vehicles.

A Nissan joint venture engine production base in Shiyan, Hubei province, was producing diesel engines c. 2010, and it is possible this location was one asset of the former Nissan joint venture Dongfeng bought out as part of the Volvo deal.

The company uses the Dongfeng Trucks brand.

Dongfeng Honda

Based in Wuhan, Hubei province, Dongfeng Honda Automobile Company was established in 2003 and manufactures Honda-branded SUVs and automobiles for the Chinese market. Products produced by this joint venture with Honda include the Honda Civic, the CR-V, and the Spirior. As of early 2011, some offerings may incorporate Japanese-made parts.

In 2010, its model line included what was China's best-selling SUV that year, the CR-V. Other Honda-branded models sold in China are made by Guangqi Honda Automobile, but a 2004 agreement allowed Dongfeng-built CR-Vs to be sold through Guangqi's showrooms.

A China-only product line debuted in 2016 with the Gienia, a mid-size hatchback.

Primary production may be at its two Wuhan, Hubei, production sites, one of which became operational c. 2012. Another plant produces engines for this joint venture in Guangzhou.

Dongfeng Nissan
Nissan and Dongfeng have a long-standing relationship. Early on, the Chinese company produced diesel-powered Nissan trucks built from complete knock-down kits, and Nissan lent Dongfeng technical assistance. When the Chinese State began allowing foreign automakers market access through joint ventures, Nissan remained with Dongfeng.

As an example of the extensive and comprehensive nature of Nissan's technical assistance to the Chinese company, in 2011 nearly 70% of products Dongfeng manufactured were connected in some way to Nissan.

Dongfeng Motor Co., Ltd. (Dongfeng Nissan)

Established in 2002, Dongfeng Motor Co., Ltd (DFL) began operating in July 2003. Nissan holds 50% ownership in this maker of heavy trucks, light commercial vehicles, and passenger cars. Heavy-duty trucks and buses exclusively carry the Dongfeng brand name, light-duty trucks use both the Nissan and Dongfeng names, and consumer offerings are Nissan products. While the great majority of passenger cars retain the Nissan name, a small number sell under the brand name Venucia which is Dongfeng–Nissan's brand which offers cheaper products targeted at less-affluent inland city consumers. Venucia (Qi Chen) launched its first models in 2012. The name is derived from that of the Roman goddess of beauty, Venus.

A few of its Dongfeng-branded light commercial vehicles have been exported to Afghanistan, Pakistan, Africa, and the Middle East.

Infiniti-branded vehicles are most probably imported as of 2006, but 2013 news stories suggested that some production would be moved to China in the future. Manufacture of the brand in China may have begun with the Q50L being produced at a site in Xiangyang sometime after 2014.

Other Nissan joint ventures

Other joint ventures include Dongfeng Nissan Passenger Vehicle Co, a unit of Dongfeng Motor Company that makes automobiles for the domestic market and has exported to Egypt. Another unit of Dongfeng Motor Co., Ltd., Zhengzhou Nissan Automobile Co, manufactures light commercial vehicles. Most Zhengzhou products are sold under the Dongfeng brand, such as the Dongfeng Rich (Rui Qi), a reworked Nissan D22.

Nissan joint venture sites
A passenger-car production base and technical center in Guangzhou, Guangdong, are part of both the Nissan joint venture Dongfeng Motor Co and a unit of that joint venture, Dongfeng Nissan Passenger Vehicle Co.

Another Guangzhou production base manufactures Nissan engines. As of 2009, a Nissan joint venture engine production base in Shiyan, Hubei province, produced diesel engines and other sites, auto parts. It is possible this location has been shuttered and the tooling moved as Dongfeng bought out Nissan's stake in a joint venture company, Dongfeng Nissan Diesel Motor Co Ltd, as part of a deal to initiate a new joint venture with Volvo. In the Huadu District of Guangzhou, a production base was under construction in late 2010. Planned to have a 240,000 units/year production capacity, these may be engines not vehicles. It could be the large-scale vehicle production base under construction in 2010 that would expand Dongfeng-Nissan local production capacity in this area to 600,000 units/year.

A joint venture with Nissan has a production base, Zhengzhou Light Truck plant, in Zhengzhou, Henan. In 2010, this was joined by a second, increasing production capacity by 120,000 units/year. Production capacity figures may consider engines and vehicles as discrete.

A handful of Nissan joint venture production bases are located in Xiangfan, Hubei, making light commercial vehicles and cars.

Dongfeng Peugeot-Citroën

Dong Feng Peugeot Citroën Automobile Company is a joint venture with PSA Peugeot-Citroën set up in 1992 and based in Wuhan, capital of Hubei province.

Currently selling a range of Peugeot and Citroën models, its first offering was a hatchback built from semi-complete knock-down kits, the ZX Fukang. Its first Peugeot-branded product was introduced in 2004.

Some of the engines made by this joint venture are used in other Dongfeng passenger car products, the Fengshen S30 and H30, for example.

As of 2010, the PSA Peugeot Citroën joint venture had two production bases in Wuhan, and a third base for this joint venture was in the planning stages around 2010. Xiangfan serves as location for a powertrain production base for the joint venture with PSA Peugeot Citroën as of 2010. An R&D center in Shanghai, the China Tech Center, is wholly owned by PSA Peugeot Citroën but lends assistance to the joint venture with this French automaker.

Dongfeng Sokon (DFSK) (defunct)

Dongfeng DFSK (Sokon) or in Chinese Dongfeng Xiaokang is Sino-sino joint venture between Dongfeng and a local company, Chongqing Sokon Industry Group Co Ltd. Brands under the joint venture includes Dongfeng Sokon (DFSK, sometimes known as DF Dongfeng as the official website suggests) light commercial vehicles and Dongfeng Fengguang passenger vehicles. Sokon also has its own electric startup brand based in North America called SF Motors.

In September 2019, Sokon acquired the remaining 50% of the DFSK joint venture from Dongfeng Motor Group (DFG), becoming 100% owner. They continue to produce vehicles using the Dongfeng logo and under the Dongfeng Sokon and Dongfeng Fengguang (Fengon) branding.

Dongfeng Renault (defunct)

Created in late 2013, Dongfeng Renault Automotive Co Ltd planned to produce 150,000 whole vehicles per year at an as-yet-unbuilt production base in China. This facility may become operational as early as 2016. 

In August 2020, the Dongfeng Renault venture was officially dissolved and Renault transferred its stake to Dongfeng.

As of 2023, Renault does not produce vehicles in China, but maintains small joint ventures that do not use Renault branding. Dongfeng and Renault both maintain a stake in EV startup BeyonCa. Renault also has a technology deal with Geely and a 50% owned joint venture with Jiangling Motor (JMEV).

Dongfeng Yulon (defunct)

An equally owned joint venture with Taiwanese automaker Yulon, Dongfeng Yulon (or Dongfeng Yulong), was set up in 2009 and will manufacture Yulon's Luxgen models in China. Dongfeng Yulon began production of its first model, the Luxgen 7 SUV, on 28 July 2011. 

The venture was liquidated in November 2020.

Dongfeng Yueda Kia (defunct)

A joint venture with the Korean Kia Motors, Dongfeng Yueda Kia Automobile Co is based in Yancheng, Jiangsu province, and produces Kia-branded automobiles for the Chinese market. As of 2007, it has two production bases–the newer located in the Yancheng Economic Development Zone of Jiangsu province.

Kia may have initially partnered with Jiangsu Yueda Auto Works–not Dongfeng–in an effort that produced the Kia Pride c. 1997. Dongfeng soon stepped in, however, forming Yueda Kia Motors in 1999 and buying out Jiangsu Yueda's ownership in March 2002. Prior to this and as of 2007, Kia had a 50% share while Dongfeng and Jiangsu Yueda Investment Co Ltd each held 25% ownership.

In 2010, the Sportage was the 8th most-purchased SUV in China. The company was reported as having two production bases in China that year.

As of 2017, Korean automakers in China continued to flog a product mix highly reliant on less-favored sedans and were seeing flagging sales amid rising political tensions between China and the Korea peninsula. Dongfeng exited the venture in 2021.

In December 2021, Dongfeng sold its 25% stake in the joint venture to Jiangsu Yueda for ¥ RMB297 million.

Minor joint ventures

Dongvo (Hangzhou) Truck Company

Reflecting its past foreign partner, Dongvo Truck Co was formerly named Dongfeng Nissan-Diesel Company. Currently, it is a joint venture between Volvo's UD Trucks and Dongfeng established in 1996.

Its manufacturing site is located in Hangzhou producing UD branded commercial vehicles and buses.

Volvo's first joint venture company with Dongfeng, Dongvo Truck Co was the precursor to a larger scale cooperation, Dongfeng Commercial Vehicles, but may continue to exist independently of this newer legal entity.

Chufeng
Chufeng (also called CHTC) was founded in 1957 as a joint venue located in Hubei.They manufacture private use vehicles, including cement mixers, dump trucks, oil tankers, crane trucks, school buses, garbage trucks, street sweepers, construction vehicles, cargo vans, box trucks, semi trucks, fire trucks, and livestock transportation vehicles.

Production bases and facilities
Originating from Hubei province, Dongfeng now has sites throughout China.

Dongfeng sites
Its primary production base for passenger vehicle manufacture is in Wuhan, capital of Hubei province, with secondary sites in the city of Wenzhou, Zhejiang province. Some commercial vehicles are most likely made in the city of Shiyan, Hubei province, as it is the home to a Dongfeng commercial vehicle division.

Overseas activities
Dongfeng sells products overseas through various legal arrangements that see mostly light commercial vehicles sold under its own brand name in a variety of formats and specifications.

Foreign countries where Dongfeng has or had a presence include: Pakistan, Indonesia, Malaysia, Myanmar, Paraguay, Philippines, Vietnam, and the United Kingdom, et al.

Dongfeng has a joint venture for assembly of commercial trucks with Pakistan's Ghandhara Nissan, whereas it assembles DFSK light commercial vehicles in Pakistan as a joint venture with Regal automobile industries limited

Sales

Brand efforts and sponsorships
Dongfeng sponsored the Chinese entry for the 2014–2015 Volvo Ocean Race, a round-the-world sailing race. Dongfeng also sponsored the winning entry in the 2017–18 Volvo Ocean Race.

Controversies 
Some Dongfeng heavy duty trucks are sold as military vehicles, and limited exports under the name Dongfeng Aeolus have occurred. Dongfeng has, at times, exported military spec vehicles to conflict-ridden nations and places including 400 to Myanmar in 2005 and 200 into Darfur, Sudan, that same year. This precipitated the Government Pension Fund of Norway abstaining from investment in Dongfeng Motor Group for a seven-year period between 2007 and 2014.

See also

Notes

References

External links
 

 
Electric vehicle manufacturers of China
Bus manufacturers of China
Truck manufacturers of China
Vehicle manufacturing companies established in 1969
Government-owned companies of China
Chinese brands
Car brands